Azygophleps kovtunovitchi is a moth in the family Cossidae. It is found in Lesotho.

References

Moths described in 2011
Azygophleps